TNN Outdoors Pro Hunter is a sports game developed by DreamForge Intertainment and published by ASC Games for Microsoft Windows in 1998. A sequel, TNN Outdoors Pro Hunter 2, was released in 1999 developed by Monolith Productions using their LithTech engine.

Reception

The game received mixed to unfavorable reviews from critics.

References

External links
 

1998 video games
Hunting video games
North America-exclusive video games
Spike (TV network)
Unreal Engine games
Video games developed in the United States
Windows games
Windows-only games
DreamForge Intertainment games
Multiplayer and single-player video games
ASC Games games